Propionivibrio limicola is a gram negative, oxidase- and catalase-negative anaerobic, fermentative, non-spore-forming, mesophilic, rod-shaped, motile bacterium from the genus of Propionivibrio which has the ability to degrade hydroaromatic compounds.

References

External links
Type strain of Propionivibrio limicola at BacDive -  the Bacterial Diversity Metadatabase

Rhodocyclaceae